Rumex triangulivalvis is a species of flowering plant belonging to the family Polygonaceae.

Its native range is Northern Europe, Northern America.

References

triangulivalvis